Brent Hartigan (born 7 April 1985) is an Australian rules football player, formerly of the Richmond Football Club in the AFL. He is the son of Dean Hartigan who played for Essendon.

Hartigan was delisted after the 2007 AFL season, after playing 7 games in 2006, just the one in 2007. He continued his career playing for Essendon's VFL side the Bendigo Bombers in the 2008 season.

In 2017 Hartigan won the inaugural Riverside Golf Open with partner Scott Krygger in somewhat controversial circumstances.

Hartigan was also part owner of champion racehorse Bern For You

Brent's off field passion currently extends to meteorology where his knowledge of the greater Melbourne area, in particular the North-Western suburbs, has become advantageous in predicting dangerous weather events.

References

External links

Richmond Football Club players
Living people
1985 births
Australian rules footballers from Victoria (Australia)
Calder Cannons players
Bendigo Football Club players